The Liga Nacional de Handebol 2018 (2018 National Handball League) was the 22nd season of the top tier Brazilian handball national competitions for clubs, it is organized by the Brazilian Handball Confederation. For the 8th time EC Pinheiros was crowned champion winning the final against Handebol Taubaté.

Teams qualified for the play-offs
South Southeast Conference
 Handebol Taubaté
 EC Pinheiros
 Handebol São Caetano
 Handebol Londrina
Northeastern Conference
 GHC CAIC
 Clube Português
Northern Conference
 Rádio Farol
Central west Conference
 AASHb

Play-offs

Final

References

External links
CBHb official web site

Bra